KREZ may refer to:

 KREZ (FM), a radio station (104.7 FM) licensed to Chaffee, Missouri, United States
 KREZ-TV, a television station (channel 6 analog/15 digital) licensed to Durango, Colorado, United States